P180 may refer to 
 Piaggio P.180 Avanti, an Italian twin-engine turboprop aircraft.
 RRBP1 (also known as p180), a human gene that encodes a membrane-bound protein of the endoplasmic reticulum.